WFPF may refer to:

 World Freerunning and Parkour Federation
 WFPF-LP, a low-power radio station (92.7 FM) licensed to serve Frostproof, Florida, United States